Enric Morera may refer to:

 Enric Morera i Viura (1865–1942), Catalan musical composer
 Enric Morera i Català (born 1964), Valencian politician, leader of the Valencian Nationalist Bloc and Compromís